Jonny Benjamin MBE (born 1987) is a British mental health campaigner, author and vlogger. In January 2014 he launched a social media campaign called Find 'Mike' to search for a stranger who had talked him out of taking his own life in 2008. The purpose of the campaign was to raise awareness of suicide and mental illness. It went viral and received global media attention. Within just two weeks Jonny found the stranger he was looking for, Neil Laybourn. The story of the campaign was made into a documentary film, The Stranger on the Bridge, that was released in May 2014.

Background
Jonny Benjamin began having mental health problems at a young age and his parents first took him to see a psychologist at the age of 5. He later developed depression at 16 and was eventually diagnosed with schizoaffective disorder, a combination of schizophrenia and bipolar disorder, in his early 20s. He had also been experiencing the delusion that he was on his own version of the film, The Truman Show, and was hospitalised as a result of his condition in January 2008. He ran away from the hospital intending to take his life by jumping off a bridge. A passerby found him on Waterloo Bridge and talked him out of ending his life by suicide, which lasted long enough for the emergency services to arrive and return him to hospital. This incident became the focus of his 2014 campaign, Find Mike.

Activism
In 2011, Benjamin started vlogging about his experiences of mental health issues on YouTube in order "to reach out to others with mental health difficulties." In 2012 a book of his poems, Pill After Pill: Poems From A Schizophrenic Mind, was published. The poetry was written mostly during his stay in hospital in 2008.

By 2013 his vlogs had drawn thousands of views and he was awarded the first annual Janey Antoniou award by the mental health charity, Rethink Mental Illness, for his mental health campaigning. Of the motivation behind his work, Benjamin said: "I know that a lot of people are reluctant to get help, and a lot of that is because of stigma. But the only way we’ll get rid of stigma is if we are more open and talk about mental illness. There is no shame or embarrassment in it. These are human experiences." He has also presented a BBC Three documentary about mental illness.

Find 'Mike' campaign and media coverage
On 14 January 2014 Jonny Benjamin launched a social media campaign called Find 'Mike' with the charity Rethink Mental Illness. He launched a public campaign to find the stranger that had talked him out of jumping off a bridge, to raise awareness of mental health and suicide. He did not know the man's name, so nicknamed him "Mike". He later said of it: "I wanted to let people know that it’s ok to have suicidal thoughts and feelings. I also hoped to show people that through talking about it, and by having someone else listen, it is possible to overcome the darkness that overwhelms a person when they feel helpless. This is something that I learned from my exchange with Neil on the bridge six years ago, and a message that I’ve been trying to pass on to others." The campaign was supported by various high-profile people including Stephen Fry, Boy George, and British Prime Minister David Cameron. Millions of people shared the story online and the hashtag "FindMike" trended in the United Kingdom, South Africa, Australia, and Canada.

Two weeks after the campaign was launched, Benjamin was reunited with the stranger, a man called Neil Laybourn. He came forward after his girlfriend saw the plea on Facebook. Laybourn said of the incident on the bridge that "maybe it was fate, it was easy to make a connection. There are people who would walk past and there are those who would have taken action. I am proud that I was in the crowd that took action."

A documentary film about the campaign produced by Postcard Productions was released in May 2014.

Subsequent campaigns
In 2016 Benjamin launched ThinkWell, an initiative to bring mental health education into schools. ThinkWell is designed to educate young people about mental health and break down the stigma surrounding mental illness and suicide through school workshops. Each session is delivered by a trained workshop leader and a qualified therapist. In the same year, he travelled to India as part of his campaigns to change attitudes and reduce stigma. He filmed his journey to India for a short documentary on his YouTube channel.

Benjamin gives talks in schools, prisons and hospitals to try and inspire others who may be struggling. Since 2017, Neil Laybourn has worked full-time for Benjamin's campaigns, and the two also ran the London Marathon together in the same year.

Books
In May 2018, Benjamin published his memoir, titled The Stranger on the Bridge.

His second book, The Book of Hope, came out in April 2021. The anthology is designed to offer inspiration to others going through hard times. Celebrities including Olympic athlete Kelly Holmes, poet Lemn Sissay, musician Frank Turner, podcaster Elizabeth Day, personal trainer Joe Wicks, and vlogger Zoe Sugg have contributed, writing about what gives them optimism in life.

Charity
The youth mental health charity Beyond was founded by Benjamin and Laybourn in 2018. In February 2021 the charity hosted the UK's first ever mental health and wellbeing festival for schools. More than 1,000 schools and colleges from across the UK and beyond took part in the festival which consisted of workshops, teaching resources and expert sessions.

Personal life
Jonny Benjamin has relapsed with his mental health several times. Benjamin cites medication, mindfulness and therapy as having helped him. He particularly advocates the use of Compassion-focused therapy as something that has been really helpful. Benjamin has a diagnosis of irritable bowel syndrome. Benjamin is openly gay.  and is of Jewish ancestry.

Honours 
 MBE

References

External links 
 
 Jonny Benjamin: I experienced much more than ‘storm and stress’ of adolescence, Interviews with exceptional minds, Eximia

Schizophrenia researchers
Mental health activists
Living people
1987 births
English LGBT people
English people of Jewish descent
People with schizoaffective disorder